Charles Revell (5 June 1919 – 1999) was an English footballer who played in the Football League for Charlton Athletic and Derby County.

External links
 

English footballers
English Football League players
Footballers from Belvedere, London
Charlton Athletic F.C. players
Derby County F.C. players
Eynesbury Rovers F.C. players
1919 births
1999 deaths
Association football forwards